The Manchester Literary and Philosophical Society, popularly known as the Lit. & Phil., is one of the oldest learned societies in the United Kingdom and second oldest provincial learned society (after the Spalding Gentlemen's Society).

Prominent members have included Robert Owen, John Dalton, James Prescott Joule, Sir William Fairbairn, Tom Kilburn, Peter Mark Roget, Sir Ernest Rutherford, Alan Turing, Sir Joseph Whitworth and Dorothy Hodgkin.

History 

It was established in February 1781, as the Literary and Philosophical Society of Manchester, by Thomas Percival, Thomas Barnes, Thomas Henry, Thomas Butterworth Bayley and others. The first formal meeting of the society took place on 14 March 1781. Meetings were held in a back room of Cross Street Chapel until December 1799, after which the society moved into its own premises in George Street. John Dalton conducted his experiments at these premises.

The Society's original premises on George Street were destroyed during the Manchester Blitz (around January 1941), at which time its library comprised more than 50,000 volumes as well as historic artefacts, portraits, and archives. Its replacement (built in the 1960s) was constructed using high alumina cement (referred to as having "concrete cancer") and was demolished in the 1980s. It became a registered charity (No. 235313) in 1964.

Membership is open to anyone aged over 16 years and lectures are held both in person at venues in Manchester City Centre, and (since 2020) online.  There are on average 30 lectures each season and non-members are welcome to attend. The society has more than 400 members.

The Society operates from an office situated in Colony Jactin House, Ancoats, Manchester, and has three permanent staff.

Activities 
The Society organises a range of lectures, including the Wilde, Joule and Dalton Lectures and three lectures annually specifically for Young People. The most prestigious lectures are the Percival Lecture and the Manchester Lecture, and in some years the most distinguished speakers are presented with the Dalton Medal. Since the local universities ceased offering extra-curricular courses the Lit. & Phil. has seen an increase in both membership and in the attendance of non-members at lectures.

Members 
Notable Members, in addition to those above, have included the Nobel Laureates, Sir Robert Robinson, Sir Norman Haworth, and Niels Bohr, as well as Chaim Weizmann, Hans Geiger, Sir William Roberts, Lyon, Lord Playfair, William Gaskell, Sir William de Wiveleslie Abney, Charles William Sutton, Sir James Kay-Shuttleworth, Joseph Jordan, Henry Moseley, Sir Adolphus William Ward, Stanley Jevons, James Prince Lee, Sir Edward Leader Williams, William Axon, Sir Henry Hoyle Howorth, Samuel Greg, Sir Edward Frankland, Samuel Hibbert-Ware and Moses Tyson.

Honorary Members have included Stephen Hawking, William Thomson, Lord Kelvin, Robert Bunsen, Sergey Kapitsa, Dmitri Mendeleev, Sir Cyril Hinshelwood, Dame Kathleen Ollerenshaw, Jöns Jacob Berzelius and John Mercer.

Memoirs 
The society's Memoirs and Proceedings (first published in 1783) was, at the time of its launch, the only regular scientific journal in the United Kingdom except for the Philosophical Transactions of the Royal Society.

The Manchester Memoirs has been published continuously since the first edition.

It contains the transactions of the society (most notably the text of many recent lectures) and is distributed to members and to similar institutions and libraries throughout the world by subscription. Copies are also available for purchase by non-members.

Dalton Medal 
Named in honour of the Society's longest-serving President, the scientist John Dalton, the Dalton Medal is a distinction rarely bestowed and is the Society’s highest award. It is given to those who have made a distinguished contribution to science.

Since 1898 the medal has been awarded on only fifteen occasions: all recipients have been Fellows of the Royal Society and many have been Nobel Laureates.

Several medallists have had Manchester and University of Manchester/Owens College connections with the Departments of Physics and Astronomy, Chemistry and Engineering. 

So far, only one woman has been a recipient of this medal.

Officers

Presidents

Secretaries

Treasurers

See also 
List of societies for education in Manchester
Spalding Gentlemen's Society
The Literary and Philosophical Society of Newcastle Upon Tyne

References 
Notes

Bibliography

External links 

Scholarly Societies – Man. Lit and Phil
Manchester Lit and Phil – official website
Memoirs and proceedings of the Manchester Literary & Philosophical Society, from 1888 to 1922 – Biodiversity Library

Organisations based in Manchester
Scientific societies based in the United Kingdom
1781 establishments in England
Organizations established in 1781
Organisations based in Greater Manchester
Charities based in Manchester
Charities based in Greater Manchester
Culture in Manchester
L
Science and technology in Greater Manchester
Publications established in 1783
Annual journals
Clubs and societies in Greater Manchester
Manchester Literary and Philosophical Society